The Vietnam People's Air Force Museum, Hanoi or Bảo Tàng Phòng Không - Không Quân is located on Truong Chinh Street in the Bach Mai District of Hanoi. The museum is on the edge of the disused Bach Mai Airfield.

The museum tells the history of the Vietnam People's Air Force (VPAF) from its formation in 1954 through to the present day. There is a heavy emphasis on its role in the Second Indochina War and the Cambodian-Vietnamese War. The museum comprises one main building with displays on the history of the VPAF, biographies of VPAF aces, uniforms and flightsuits, aircraft weaponry and engines, items from downed US aircraft and the forward fuselage of a MiG-21. Outside is a static park with aircraft of the VPAF and the Republic of Vietnam Air Force.

The museum is open Mon.-Thurs. and Sat.-Sun. from 08:00 to 11:00 and 13:00 to 16:00. Entry fee is 20,000 VND

Aircraft on display
Aircraft on outside display include:

Aero L-29 Delfin
Antonov An-2
Plaque states that this aircraft was used in the attack on a secret US radar site at Phou Pha Thi (Battle of Lima Site 85)
Bell UH-1 Iroquois H model
Cessna A-37 Dragonfly
Cessna O-1 Bird Dog
Douglas A-1 Skyraider H model
Kamov Ka-25Bsh
McDonnell Douglas F-4 Phantom II B model (wreckage)
Mikoyan-Gurevich MiG-17F
Mikoyan-Gurevich MiG-21MF & PFM
The MiG-21PFM has 12 victory stars painted on its nose, plaque states that one of the victories was US Air Force F-4E 67-0296, shot down on 5 July 1972 by Nguyễn Tiến Sâm
The MiG-21MF has 8 victory stars painted on its nose, plaque states that one of the victories was a B-52D model, shot down on 27 December 1972 by Pham Tuan. This aircraft is displayed carrying an AA-1 Alkali radar guided missile inboard of an AA-2 Atoll IR-homing missile
Mil Mi-4
Plaque states that this was Ho Chi Minh's personal helicopter
Mil Mi-6 Hook-A
Mil Mi-24 Hind A
Northrop F-5 Freedom Fighter
Ryan Firebee (wreckage)
Shenyang J-5
Plaque states that this aircraft scored 9 victories, one of which was US Air Force F-4C 63-7614, shot down on 12 May 1967 by Ngo Duc Mai
Shenyang J-6
TL-1
A Vietnamese designed and built training and liaison aircraft
Zlin Z-26

Other display items

Also on display outside are:

57 mm AZP S-60
Fan Song radar
M1939 37mm AA gun
M3 Half-track
Plaque states that this was formerly used by Groupe Mobile 100 and captured in the Battle of Mang Yang Pass
PT-76 light amphibious tank
SA-2 Guideline SAM
ZPU-4

See also
List of aerospace museums
B-52 Victory Museum, Hanoi
Bach Mai Airfield

References

Air force museums
Museums in Hanoi
History museums in Vietnam
Indochina Wars
Military and war museums in Vietnam
Vietnam War museums